The Warm Life is a 1963 Italian  drama film written and directed by Florestano Vancini and starring Catherine Spaak. It is based loosely on the novel La calda vita by Pier Antonio Quarantotti Gambini. Read more

Plot

Cast
 Catherine Spaak as Sergia
 Fabrizio Capucci as Max
 Jacques Perrin as Freddi
 Gabriele Ferzetti as Guido
 Halina Zalewska 		
 Marcella Rovena 		
 Daniele Vargas

References

External links

1963 films
Italian drama films
1960s Italian-language films
Films shot in Sardinia
Films directed by Florestano Vancini
Films scored by Carlo Rustichelli
1960s Italian films